Australian Unity is an Australian mutual company having its origins in the friendly societies movement. It was formed as the Manchester Unity Independent Order of Oddfellows (MUIOOF) in Melbourne, Victoria, on 7 December 1840 by eight men including Thomas Strode, publisher of the Port Phillip Gazette and Augustus Greeves, inspired by Independent Order of Oddfellows Manchester Unity. In 1993, Manchester Unity merged with the Australian Natives' Association to form Australian Unity. Later mergers occurred with Grand United Friendly Society in 2005, Lifeplan Australia Friendly Society in 2009, and Big Sky Credit Union in 2012. Australian Unity has about 8,500 employees across healthcare, insurance and banking (in the guise of Big Sky Credit Union) divisions.

In 2012, Big Sky was merged with Australian Unity to become the banking arm of Australian Unity. Ownership of Big Sky Credit Union Limited was transferred to Australian Unity Limited's subsidiary Lifeplan Australia Building Society Limited and renamed Big Sky Building Society Limited. Members of Big Sky Credit Union became members of Australian Unity.

The Manchester Unity Building is a neo-Gothic Art Deco skyscraper in Melbourne, Australia, constructed in 1932. Another Melbourne building formerly owned by Manchester Unity Oddfellows, at 335-347 Swanston Street, constructed in 1940-41, opposite the State Library of Victoria, was compulsorily acquired by the Commonwealth government in 1947.

History

Manchester Unity Independent Order of Oddfellows (MUIOOF)

Australian Natives' Association

Grand United Friendly Society

Grand United Order of Oddfellows Friendly Society (GUOOFS)

Lifeplan Australia Friendly Society

Big Sky Credit Union

References

Friendly societies
Medical and health organisations based in Australia
Financial services companies of Australia
Insurance in Australia
Health insurance in Australia
Organizations established in 1840
Financial services companies established in 1993
1993 establishments in Australia
Companies based in Melbourne